The Perfect Ones is a 2018 Russian romantic drama film directed by Kirill Pletnyov. Starring Polina Maksimova and Lyubov Aksyonova. It is available in wide distribution in Russia on October 11, 2018.

Plot
Two girls who loved one man, after his death receive messages, the author of which can only be him. In the hope of a miracle, the two of them will have to go on a journey, which his clues pave to reveal the secret behind the mysterious messages.

Cast
 Lyubov Aksyonova as Ksenia
 Polina Maksimova as Kira
 Rinal Mukhametov as Dima
Kirill Pletnyov as Vanya
Anna Kamenkova as Ksenia's mother
Evgeniya Dmitrieva as Roza
 Vladimir Yaglych as Anton
Agrippina Steklova as Alyona
 Alexey Shevchenkov as  owner of a roadside cafe

Production 
Filming lasted 28 shifts and took place in Moscow, Moscow Oblast, Anapa and in the most picturesque places of  Krasnodar Krai. For filming the scene in the boat was used the longest camera crane in Russia. Its length is 27 meters.

References

External links
 
 Музыка, гламур и банальности: смешать и долго взбалтывать
  Без меня  — второй полнометражный фильм Кирилла Плетнёва

Russian drama road movies
2010s drama road movies
Films set in Russia
Films shot in Russia
2018 drama films
Columbia Pictures films